The 58th Acropolis Rally is the sixth round of 2012 FIA World Rally Championship. The event took place between 24 and 27 May 2012.

Results

Event standings

Special stages

Power Stage
The "Power stage" was a  stage at the end of the rally.

References

 

Acropolis
Acropolis Rally
Rally Acropolis